Sammy Giammalva Jr. (born March 24, 1963) is a former professional tennis player from the United States. During his career he won 2 singles titles and 4 doubles titles.  He achieved a career-high singles ranking of World No. 28 in 1985 and a career-high doubles ranking of World No. 22 in 1984.

Giammalva's father Sam played top-level amateur tennis and participated on two Davis Cup winning teams for the U.S.  His older brother Tony was also a touring pro.

Giammalva left the Grand Prix tour in 1989 and enrolled in Rice University.

ATP career finals

Singles: 7 (2 titles, 5 runner-ups)

Doubles: 17 (4 titles, 13 runner-ups)

Performance timeline

Singles

Doubles

References

External links
 
 

American male tennis players
American people of Italian descent
Tennis players from Houston
Rice University alumni 
1963 births
Living people